was a  after Kanpyō and before Engi. This period spanned the years from April 898 through July 901.

Change of era
 January 26, 898 : The new era name was created to mark an event or series of events. The previous era ended and the new one commenced in Ninna 5, on the 16th day of the 4th month of 898.

Events of the Shōtai era
 December 7, 899 (Shōtai 2, 1st day of the 11th month): The sun entered into the winter solstice, and all the great officials of the empire presented themselves in Daigo's court.
 February 6, 900 (Shōtai 3, 3rd day of the 1st month):  Daigo went to visit his father in the place Uda had chosen to live after the abdication.
He visited the temples on the slopes of the mountain.

Notes

References
 Brown, Delmer M. and Ichirō Ishida, eds. (1979).  Gukanshō: The Future and the Past. Berkeley: University of California Press. ;  OCLC 251325323
 Nussbaum, Louis-Frédéric and Käthe Roth. (2005).  Japan encyclopedia. Cambridge: Harvard University Press. ;  OCLC 58053128
 Titsingh, Isaac. (1834). Nihon Ōdai Ichiran; ou,  Annales des empereurs du Japon.  Paris: Royal Asiatic Society, Oriental Translation Fund of Great Britain and Ireland. OCLC 5850691
 Varley, H. Paul. (1980). A Chronicle of Gods and Sovereigns: Jinnō Shōtōki of Kitabatake Chikafusa. New York: Columbia University Press. ;  OCLC 6042764

External links
 National Diet Library, "The Japanese Calendar" -- historical overview plus illustrative images from library's collection

Japanese eras